This is a list of Suzuki automobiles from past and present. Most are designed and manufactured by Suzuki, while some vehicles are produced by other companies and supplied to Suzuki through an OEM supply basis. Many models are limited to some regions, while some others are marketed worldwide.

Current models

Former models 

 Maruti 800 (1983–2014)
 Suzuki Alto (Europe)/A-Star (2008–2018)
 Suzuki Aerio/Liana (2001–2018)
 Suzuki Cappuccino (1991–1998)
 Suzuki Cara (1993–1994)
 Suzuki Cervo (1977–2009)
 Suzuki Cultus/Esteem/Forsa (1983–2003)
 Suzuki Cultus Crescent/Esteem/Baleno (1995–2007)
 Suzuki CV1 (1981–1985)
 Suzuki Every Plus/Landy (1999–2005)
 Suzuki Equator (2008–2012)
 Suzuki Forenza/Reno (2004–2008)
 Suzuki Fronte (1962–1989)
 Suzuki Fun (2003–2011)
 Suzuki Karimun (1999–2006)
 Suzuki Karimun Wagon R (2013–2021)
 Suzuki Kei (1998–2009)
 Suzuki Kizashi (2009–2016)
 Suzuki Mega Carry/APV pickup (2004–2019)
 Suzuki Mehran (1988–2019)
 Suzuki Mighty Boy (1983–1988)
 Suzuki MR Wagon (2001–2016)
 Suzuki Neo Baleno (2008–2011)
 Suzuki Palette (2008–2013)
 Suzuki Sidekick (1988–2001)
 Suzuki Splash/Ritz (2007–2018)
 Suzulight 360 (1959–1969)
 Suzulight SF series (1955–1959)
 Suzuki Swift+ (2003–2010)
 Suzuki Twin (2003–2005)
 Suzuki Verona (2003–2006)
 Suzuki Wagon R+ (1997–2008)
 Suzuki X-90 (1995–1997)
 Suzuki XL-7 (1998–2009)
 Suzuki Zen Estilo/Estilo/Karimun Estilo (2006–2012)

OEM deals 
Since 1985, Suzuki has shared or produced automobiles for other manufacturers around the world.

Donor 

Changan
 Chana Star – China (Suzuki Carry/Every Plus)
 Changan Alto – China (Suzuki Alto)
 Changan SC series – China (Suzuki Carry/Every Plus)
 Hafei Songhuajiang – China (Suzuki Carry)

Changhe
 Changhe Beidouxing – China (Suzuki Wagon R)
 Changhe Coolcar – China (Suzuki Every Plus)
 Changhe Liana – China (Suzuki Liana)
 Changhe Splash – China (Suzuki Splash)

Fiat
 Fiat Sedici – Europe (Suzuki SX4)
 Lancia Pangea – Europe (Suzuki SX4) (cancelled)

Ford
 Ford Pronto – Taiwan (Suzuki Carry/Every)

General Motors
 Asüna Sunrunner – Canada (Suzuki Sidekick/Vitara)
 Bedford Rascal – Europe (Suzuki Carry)
 Chevrolet Alto – Colombia (Suzuki Alto)
 Chevrolet Cassia – Philippines (Suzuki Cultus Crescent)
 Chevrolet Cruze – Japan (Suzuki Swift)
 Chevrolet Damas - Uzbekistan (Suzuki Every)
 Chevrolet Esteem – Colombia (Suzuki Cultus Crescent)
 Chevrolet Forsa – Ecuador (Suzuki Cultus) 
 Chevrolet Grand Nomad – South America (Suzuki XL-7)
 Chevrolet Labo - Uzbekistan (Suzuki Carry)
 Chevrolet MW – Japan (Suzuki Solio)
 Chevrolet Sprint – United States/Canada (Suzuki Cultus)
 Chevrolet Super Carry – South America (Suzuki Carry)
 Chevrolet Swift – South America (Suzuki Cultus)
 Chevrolet SX4 S-Cross – Ecuador (Suzuki S-Cross)
 Chevrolet Tracker – United States/Canada (Suzuki Sidekick/Vitara)
 Chevrolet Vitara – South America (Suzuki Sidekick/Vitara)
 Chevrolet Wagon R+ – Colombia (Suzuki Wagon R+)
 Daewoo Damas - South Korea/Uzbekistan/Vietnam (Suzuki Every)
 Daewoo Labo - South Korea/Uzbekistan (Suzuki Carry)
 Daewoo Tico - South Korea/Europe/South America (Suzuki Alto)
 Geo Metro – United States (Suzuki Cultus)
 Geo Tracker – United States (Suzuki Sidekick/Vitara)
 GMC Tracker – Canada (Suzuki Sidekick/Vitara)
 GME Rascal – Europe (Suzuki Carry)
 Holden Barina – Australia & New Zealand (Suzuki Cultus)
 Holden Cruze – Australia (Suzuki Ignis)
 Holden Drover – Australia & New Zealand (Suzuki Sierra/Jimny)
 Holden Scurry – Australia (Suzuki Carry)
 Opel Agila – Europe (Suzuki Wagon R+ and Suzuki Splash)
 Pontiac Firefly – Canada (Suzuki Cultus)
 Pontiac Sunrunner – Canada (Suzuki Sidekick/Vitara)
 Vauxhall Agila – United Kingdom (Suzuki Wagon R+ and Suzuki Splash)
 Vauxhall Rascal – United Kingdom (Suzuki Carry)

Isuzu
 Isuzu Geminett – Japan (Suzuki Cultus)

Maruti
All Maruti models since the Esteem are referred as Maruti Suzuki
 Maruti 800 – India (Suzuki Alto)
 Maruti 1000 – India (Suzuki Cultus)
 Maruti Gypsy – India (Suzuki Jimny)
 Maruti Omni – India (Suzuki Carry)

Mazda
 Autozam AZ-Wagon – Japan (Suzuki Wagon R)
 Autozam Scrum – Japan (Suzuki Every)
 Mazda AZ-Offroad – Japan (Suzuki Jimny)
 Mazda Carol – Japan (Suzuki Alto)
 Mazda Flair – Japan (Suzuki Wagon R)
 Mazda Flair Wagon – Japan (Suzuki Palette and Suzuki Spacia)
 Mazda Flair Crossover – Japan (Suzuki Hustler)
 Mazda Laputa – Japan (Suzuki Kei)
 Mazda Proceed Levante – Japan (Suzuki Vitara)
 Mazda Scrum – Japan (Suzuki Carry/Every)
 Mazda Scrum Wagon – Japan (Suzuki Every Wagon)
 Mazda Spiano – Japan (Suzuki Lapin)
 Mazda VX-1 – Indonesia (Suzuki Ertiga)

Mitsubishi Motors
 Mitsubishi Colt T120SS – Indonesia (Suzuki Carry Futura)
 Mitsubishi Delica D:2 - Japan (Suzuki Solio)
 Mitsubishi Maven – Indonesia (Suzuki APV)
 Mitsubishi Minicab - Japan (Suzuki Carry/Every)
 Mitsubishi Town Box - Japan (Suzuki Every Wagon)

Nissan
 Nissan Moco – Japan (Suzuki MR Wagon)
 Nissan NT100 Clipper - Japan (Suzuki Carry)
 Nissan NV100 Clipper - Japan (Suzuki Every)
 Nissan NV100 Clipper Rio - Japan (Suzuki Every Wagon)
 Nissan Pino – Japan (Suzuki Alto)
 Nissan Pixo - Europe (Suzuki Alto)
 Suzuki Palette – Japan (Suzuki Palette)

Proton
 Proton Ertiga – Malaysia (Suzuki Ertiga)

Santana Motor
 Santana 300/350 - Spain (Suzuki Grand Vitara)

Subaru
 Subaru Justy – Europe (Suzuki Swift and Suzuki Ignis)

Toyota
 Toyota Belta – India/Middle East/Africa (Suzuki Ciaz)
 Toyota Glanza – India (Suzuki Baleno)
 Toyota Starlet – Africa (Suzuki Baleno)
 Toyota Rumion – South Africa (Suzuki Ertiga)
 Toyota Urban Cruiser – India/Africa (Suzuki Vitara Brezza)
 Toyota Urban Cruiser Hyryder – India/Africa (Suzuki Grand Vitara)

Volkswagen
 Volkswagen city car (Suzuki Alto/A-Star)
 Volkswagen Rocktan (Suzuki SX4)
 – both development suspended or cancelled due to the dispute between the companies.

Recipient 

General Motors
 Suzuki Forenza – United States (Daewoo Lacetti sedan/wagon)
 Suzuki Fun – Argentina (Chevrolet Celta)
 Suzuki Reno – United States (Daewoo Lacetti hatchback)
 Suzuki Swift – United States/Canada (Geo/Chevrolet Metro)
 Suzuki Swift+ – Canada (Chevrolet Aveo)
 Suzuki Verona – United States (Daewoo Magnus)

Mazda
 Suzuki Cara – Japan (Autozam AZ-1)

Nissan
 Suzuki Equator – United States (Nissan Frontier)
 Suzuki Landy – Japan (Nissan Serena)

Toyota
 Suzuki Across – Europe (Toyota RAV4)
 Suzuki Swace – Europe (Toyota Corolla Touring Sports)
 Suzuki Landy – Japan (Toyota Noah)

See also 
 List of Suzuki engines
List of Suzuki motorcycles

References 

S